The Municipality of Kostanjevica na Krki is a municipality in the traditional Lower Carniola region of southern Slovenia. The seat of the municipality is the town of Kostanjevica na Krki. It is part of the Lower Sava Statistical Region. It is located in the northern foothills of the Gorjanci Hills and extends to the border with Croatia.

Settlements
In addition to the municipal seat of Kostanjevica na Krki, the municipality also includes the following settlements:

 Avguštine
 Črešnjevec pri Oštrcu
 Črneča Vas
 Dobe
 Dobrava pri Kostanjevici
 Dolnja Prekopa
 Dolšce
 Globočice pri Kostanjevici
 Gornja Prekopa
 Grič
 Ivanjše
 Jablance
 Karlče
 Kočarija
 Koprivnik
 Male Vodenice
 Malence
 Orehovec
 Oštrc
 Podstrm
 Ržišče
 Sajevce
 Slinovce
 Velike Vodenice
 Vrbje
 Vrtača
 Zaboršt

References

External links

 Municipality of Kostanjevica na Krki on Geopedia
 Kostanjevica municipal website 

Kostanjevica na Krki